Detroit Techno Militia is a grass roots collective of DJ's and producers located in Detroit, MI on a mission to promote Detroit Techno around the world. They compare their mission to restoring an old building. Musically, they believe that Detroit has a lot to offer, and they want to make sure the rest of the world knows about it.

After years of incorporation, in early 2007 Detroit Techno Militia formally launched their record label with a distribution deal from Cratesavers Muzik. After three very successful 12" vinyl EP releases, DTM001, DTM002, and DTM003, they amicably split with Cratesavers and took all of the responsibilities in-house. Their next two 12" vinyl EPs, DTM004, and DTM005 were independently released and distributed. Today, the Detroit Techno Militia continues to release music on their own vinyl label, their digital label: "DTM Digital", and several other internationally distributed record labels.

The Detroit Techno Militia also features ensemble acts with multiple DJs performing on multiple turntables at the same time. In the summer of 2007, the DTM 5x5 was formed. The DTM 5x5 was the first group in the Techno genre to feature five DJs (Darkcube, T.Linder, DJ Seoul, Neil V. and DJ Psycho) performing together on five analog turntables. On April 17, 2010, at The Fillmore Detroit, Detroit Techno Militia won the Detroit Music Awards Electronic/Dance Category: Outstanding Electronic Music Group, following in the footstep of previous winners and Detroit legends: Carl Craig & Amp Fiddler. Their groundbreaking performance on the Made In Detroit Stage at the 2011 Movement: Detroit Electronic Music Festival stands out as one of the most memorable sets at the three-day festival.

In 2013, Detroit Techno Militia launched their first internet podcast called The Grid. The two-hour show is broadcast on Burst Radio in Detroit.

Discography

Selected singles and EPs
Vinyl records
 DTM001 Mercenary, The (4) / Loner.9 / Sougon, 2007
 DTM002 T.Linder, 2007
 DTM003 T.Linder Feat. Blak Tony, 2007
 DTM004 DJ Seoul (2) / Mercenary, The (4) / Darkcube, 2009
 DTM005 Dimitri Pike / Annix / T.Linder, 2010
 DTM006 Shawn Rudiman, 2013

Digital releases
 DTMD001 T.Linder "War at 313.3", 2011
 DTMD002 Darkcube "Fogbank EP", 2012
 DTMD003 Loner.9 "Step and Fetch", 2012
 DTMD004 Annix "Pandorica", 2012
 DTMD005 Dimitri Pike "Russell EP" 2012
 DTMD006 Shawn Rudiman "Monolithic Soul - Installment I (Limited Edition)", 2013
 DTMD007 Shawn Rudiman "Monolithic Soul - Installment II (Limited Edition)", 2013
 DTMD008 Shawn Rudiman "Monolithic Soul - Installment III (Limited Edition)", 2013
 DTMD009 Shawn Rudiman "Monolithic Soul - Installment IV (Limited Edition)", 2013

Releases on other labels
 CSI 003 Detroit Techno Militia "Midnight Madness", 2011

DJ-mixes and compilations
 T.Linder / No Retreat. No Surrender, 2002
 T.Linder / Cut:Thrust, 2003
 T.Linder / Midnight Funk Aggression, 2004
 T.Linder / Electrofying Elements 1, 2004
 T.Linder / Electrofying Elements 2, 2004
 T.Linder / Global Assault, 2010
 DJ Seoul / Resonance, 2010
 DJ Psycho / THE DUNGEON SERIES - The Stairs, 2011
 Dimitri Pike / DTM:RECON313, 2012
 DJ Psycho / A unica forma de luta, 2012
 DJ Psycho / Bwaanzhii-Niimiidiwin (War Dance), 2012
 T.Linder & DJ Seoul / DTM2x4 DJmix, 2012
 T.Linder / Liver Noise remixes January 2016

References

External links 
 
 Detroit Techno Militia Discography
 Detroit Techno Militia Bandcamp

American DJs